Tony Parisi may refer to:

Tony Parisi (wrestler) (1941–2000), birth name Antonio Pugliese, Italian wrestler
Tony Parisi (software developer)